Policemen is a 1995 Italian crime-drama film directed by Giulio Base.

Cast 
Claudio Amendola: Lorenzo Ferri, aka "Lazzaro"
Kim Rossi Stuart: Andrea
Michele Placido: Sante Carella
Roberto Citran: Guido
Nadia Farès: Stella
Luigi Diberti: Berardi
Fulvio Milani: Aureli
Stefania Rocca: Valeria

References

External links

1995 films
Italian crime drama films
1990s crime drama films
Films directed by Giulio Base
1994 drama films
1994 films
1995 drama films
1990s Italian films